Ellsworth Lee Kingery (born August 6, 1929) is a former American football defensive back who played for the Chicago Cardinals. He played college football at Tulane University, having previously attended Lake Charles High School.

References

1929 births
Living people
American football defensive backs
Tulane Green Wave football players
Chicago Cardinals players
Players of American football from Louisiana
Sportspeople from Lake Charles, Louisiana